Metamecyna is a genus of beetles in the family Cerambycidae, containing the following species:

 Metamecyna flavoapicalis Breuning, 1969
 Metamecyna uniformis Breuning, 1939

References

Apomecynini
Taxa named by Stephan von Breuning (entomologist)